Tanya Smith (born 12 December 1984) is an Australian basketball player who played NCAA Division I at the University of Hawaii at Manoa in the Women's National Basketball League for Townsville Fire, Sydney University Flames and a short stint for Canberra Capitals. Tanya was a member of the Australian University National Basketball Team of the 2007 Summer Universiade held Thailand where Australia won Gold Medal.

Personal life
Smith now Tanya Pentti was born in Sydney on 12 December 1984. She was married in 2019 in Palm Beach, New South Wales.

Basketball

Juniors
Smith played juniors and Waratah Basketball League for Sutherland Sharks. Smith was ranked 3 in the league's total rebounds in 2004. In 2010/11 was in the All-Star 5.

NCAA
Smith received a full-ride scholarship to the University of Hawaii at Manoa playing season 2004–2008 making her most noticeable impact in season 2006/2007, 2007/2008.

Smith was the only player in the 2007–2008 season to start all 30 games. Smith was named 2007–2008 All-Western Athletic Conference Second Team, All-Wac Defensive Team, Pre-Season All-Wac selection, WAC player of the week 3 times, All-Tournament Waikiki Beach Marriott Resort Classic, All-Tournament Team Island Imaging Paradise Classic. She had 20 double-doubles 07/08 season. Smith set a regular-season WAC recorder with 25 rebounds against Idaho and tied her record with 25 points against Boise State. 
2006–2007 Season Smith recorded nine double-doubles for the season, was named all-WAC first-team selection. She led the team in rebounds and field goal percentage. Her honors included 2006 Bank of Hawaii Invitational and WAC Player of the Week and 2006–07 all-WAC first team.

WNBL
Smith signed with Townsville Fire in the WNBL in 2008 and played seasons 2008/2009, 2009/2010 Sydney University Flames 2010/2011 before retiring due to a foot injury. In 2015 Smith returned for a short contract with the Canberra Capitals Smith averaged 5.2 points and 5 rebounds per game in 24 games for Townsville. Tanya holds the second-highest all-time offensive rebounds with 16 offensive boards. She made her biggest impact in the league with her offensive rebounds.

In 2009/2010, Smith averaged 9.9 points, 9.6 rebounds (4.8 offensive) and 2.3 assists in the regular season. Stats cite SportsTG Tanya Smith pulled down a career-high 21 rebounds for Townsville against Canberra Capitals as well as blocked six shots and making 10 points in November 2009

International Games
Smith first played for Australia at 2007 Summer Universiade Thailand where the Australian Women's Basketball Team won gold.

References

External links
 Tanya Smith: WNBL

Tanya Smith 

Living people
Australian women's basketball players
Canberra Capitals players
Basketball players from Sydney
1984 births
University of Hawaiʻi
Townsville Fire players
Forwards (basketball)
Sportswomen from New South Wales